This is a list of home video releases of the Japanese anime series Dragon Ball Z.

Region 1 (North America)

VHS/DVD Saga Box Set

Individual home video list

Ultimate Uncut Edition Box Sets

Season Box Sets

Funimation Dragon Box Z Sets

Blu-ray Level releases

Season Blu-ray releases

Original English dub Collector's DVD Box Set

30th Anniversary Collector's Edition

Steelbook releases

Kai releases

Volumes

Seasons

Region 2

Dragon Box Z Sets (Japan)

Season Box Sets (United Kingdom)

Steelbooks (United Kingdom)

References

External links

Dragon Ball Z
Home Video Releases
Home Video Releases